I Think My Older Brother Used to Listen to Lagwagon is a Lagwagon EP released in 2008. It is their first recording released since 2005's Resolve and final recording with longtime bassist Jesse Buglione, who left the band in 2010.

Track listing
B Side
No Little Pill
Errands
Memoirs and Landmines
Fallen
Live It Down
Mission Unaccomplished

External links

I Think My Older Brother Used to Listen to Lagwagon at YouTube (streamed copy where licensed)

Lagwagon albums
Albums produced by Joey Cape
2008 EPs
Fat Wreck Chords EPs